Angelo Quaglio the younger (13 December 1829, Munich - 5 January 1890, Munich)) was a German stage designer of Italian descent.  He worked mainly in Munich, and assisted Richard Wagner in the premieres of a number of his works.

Angelo was part of the Quaglio family originally from the town of Laino, between Lake Como and Lake Lugano. Simon Quaglio (1795–1878) was a German stage designer.  He worked mainly in Munich, and was among the first designers to use built scenery instead of painted flats.  He designed over 100 productions during his career. Simon's father, Giuseppe Quaglio (1747–1828), practiced scene painting in Mannheim, Frankfurt, and Ludwigsburg. Simon's brother, Angelo Quaglio the Elder (1778—1815) was an architect and painter. He designed and painted landscapes and architectural pictures for Sulpiz Boisserée's work on Cologne Cathedral.

References

James Anderson, The Complete Dictionary of Opera and Operetta.

1829 births
1890 deaths
German scenic designers
19th-century Italian painters
Italian male painters
19th-century Italian male artists